Esslingen am Neckar (Swabian: Esslenga am Neckor) is a town in the Stuttgart Region of Baden-Württemberg in southern Germany, seat of the District of Esslingen as well as the largest town in the district. Within Baden-Württemberg it is the 11th largest city.

The regions surrounding the city of Esslingen are also mostly developed.

Esslingen was a free imperial city for several centuries until it was annexed by Württemberg in 1802.

The German Timber-Frame Road passes through the city.

History

Prehistoric times 
There is archaeological evidence that what is now the city of Esslingen was settled since the Neolithic period. Traces of human settlement found at the site of the city church date back to around 1000 B.C.

Roman times 
In the 1st century AD the Esslingen region became part of the Roman Empire. During this period a Roman warehouse was located in the area of Oberesslingen. The nearest major Roman settlements and garrisons were at Cannstatt and Köngen.

Migration and Merovingian period 
There are so far no findings from the early Alemanni period, which do exist on the Filder (uplands) nearby. There are findings in Rüdern which suggest a rich grave with eastern influence, including, for example, a set of three-winged spear heads. The ending "-ingen" indicates a group of people wherein a man named Azzilo, Hezzilo or Hetsilo was landlord and family patriarch played an influential role. This means the city's name originally meant: "the peoples of Azzilo". This name, for the first time documented in 856 as Ezlinga and 866 as Hetsilinga ended up becoming today's Esslingen.

In the 6th century, the Alemanni were subjugated by the Merovingians under king Clovis I. But they still took over administrative tasks and formed a Duchy in Francia. In the 8th century they tried to become sovereign again. But the attempt failed near Cannstatt.  The end of the Alemannian duchy was marked with the Council of Cannstatt.

In an excavation by Günter Fehring, the remains of the Vitalis-Cella under the church St. Dionysius were uncovered. Proof of settlement dates back to the late Merovingian period. Even older are the single row graves in Oberesslingen and Sirnau.

Middle Ages 
Esslingen was first mentioned in 777 as Ezelinga in the last will of Abbot Fulrad from Saint-Denis (near Paris), the chaplain of Pippin and Charlemagne. He bequeathed the church sixth cell upon the river Neckar to his monastery, Saint-Denis. He also brought the bones of Saint Vitalis to Esslingen, which made it a destination for pilgrims and led to its growth.

Around 800 Esslingen became a market town, its market rights being certified in 866. In 949–953 it was a possession of Liudolf, Duke of Swabia. Esslingen received city rights in 1229 under Emperor Frederick II. During the same period the still-extant Neckar bridge was built, making Esslingen a major center for trade on the route between Italy, Switzerland, and northern Germany. Taxes provided by the bridge and market led to further growth of the town, as did the export of the highly regarded wines from the region.

The period between the 13th century and 16th century saw many conflicts between the Free Imperial City and the Counts of Württemberg (later Duchy of Württemberg). About half the population lost their lives in the Thirty Years War between 1618 and 1648 through famine or epidemics. Esslingen lost its independence as an Imperial city during the Napoleonic era in 1802–1803, becoming part of the Duchy of Württemberg.

19th century to Present
The beginning of the 19th century was characterized by industrialization. Glove manufacturing, food processing, textiles, and metal working were early industries in Esslingen. On 20 November 1845 the first train ran from Cannstatt to Esslingen station.

Esslingen was occupied by U.S. troops starting in April 1945, at the very end of World War II. During the war the city suffered very little damage, and it was peaceably surrendered to the approaching allied forces, thus the medieval character of its city center has been mostly preserved.

After the Second World War about 47,000 people moved to Esslingen, mostly refugees and displaced persons from East Germany. Housing developments in Oberesslingen and Zollberg were created to overcome the shortage of housing.

In 1973 Nürtingen district was merged with Esslingen am Neckar, making Esslingen the seat of a much enlarged district.

Largest groups of immigrants by 31.12.2020 :

Transport

Air transport
 
Stuttgart Airport, the largest airport in Baden-Württemberg, is located in the Esslingen District, roughly ten kilometers south of the town, on the border with the town of Leinfelden-Echterdingen. A plane owned by Lufthansa has been named after the town.
 
The junction on the Bundesautobahn 8 Karlsruhe-Munich which serves Esslingen is just after the airport when traveling towards Munich.

Road Transport
 
Esslingen is directly on the B10 State Highway which runs as a dual carriageway from Stuttgart to Süßen, and continues onward to Ulm. The exit for Esslingen, just after the B10 passes under the ancient Pliensau Bridge, is particularly unusual, because in the direction of Ulm there are two entry and exit points to the dual carriageway. This makes it is possible to reach the center of Esslingen directly from Stuttgart, and to drive from central Esslingen directly onto the Dual Carriageway in the direction of Ulm without having to pass traffic lights.
 
Despite the six to eight lanes on the new Pliensau Bridge and the surrounding roads, the infrastructure around Pliensauvorstadt and the route to Zollberg still suffers from frequent congestion.

Esslingen is also on the German Timber-Frame Road.

Long Distance Rail Transport
 
Esslingen (Neckar) station is on the Fils Valley Railway and is served by line S 1 of the Stuttgart S-Bahn and regional services. The town is on the main rail line between Stuttgart and Ulm, operated by Deutsche Bahn, the main German rail operator. In 2009, the company named a high speed 'Intercity-Express' train "Esslingen-am-Neckar".

S-Bahn
 
The Stuttgart S-Bahn line S1 which operates between Kirchheim-unter-Teck and Herrenberg via Stuttgart centre, serves the stations of Mettingen, Esslingen (Neckar), Oberesslingen and Esslingen (Zell). Under the planned rebuilding of the railways in central Stuttgart under the Stuttgart 21 scheme, the S1 will be shortened to operate from Kirchheim unter Teck as far as Stuttgart Schwabstraße station.

Direct bus connection to Stuttgart Airport
 
To avoid the long S-Bahn route to the airport via Stuttgart, the Bus 122, operated by the END Company, now runs directly from the central bus and rail interchange to the airport via Ostfildern Scharnhausen.

Urban Tramway

The Esslingen Urban Tram system was opened in May 1912 and closed on 7 July 1944 after 32 years of operation. It was replaced by trolley buses. The operating company, the Esslinger Städtische Straßenbahn (ESS, translated Esslingen Town Tramway) changed its name in 1944 to the Städtischer Verkehrsbetrieb Esslingen (SVE, or "Esslingen Transport Company").

Former Interurban Tram

On 18 December 1926 the Esslingen-Nellingen-Denkendorf (END) interurban tram began operating. This was the last tram system to be built in Germany before the wave of closures later in the century: after this date permission from the authorities was only given for extensions to existing systems. The tram had to negotiate a five kilometer gradient out of the Neckar Valley to reach the towns and villages of the Eastern Filder region. In total, the system transported 153 million passengers from Denkendorf and later from Neuhausen to Esslingen, and took delivery of two new open trams in 1958. The line was discontinued in February 1978.

Trolley bus and diesel bus
 
Esslingen, along with Solingen and Eberswalde, is one of the last three German towns which still use trolleybuses. The SVE currently operates two lines using electric power:
 
101: Oberesslingen Lerchenacker Endstation – Esslingen railway station – Stuttgart-Obertürkheim station.
 
118: Esslingen Railway Station – Zollberg.
 
Apart from this around 50 taxis operate in the town.

Car-Sharing
 
In 1994 A car-sharing company opened a station in Esslingen.

Rebuilding of bus/rail interchange
 
An ambitious redevelopment project has been in progress since 2004 in the area near the railway station. The current phase of this project is a large redevelopment of the station forecourt costing about 7.4 million Euros. The Baden-Württemberg State Environment and Transport ministry helped fund this with a grant of 4.9 million Euros. During 2009 the Neckarstraße was diverted along unused land on the railway station and lengthened to the west of the site. The next phase, completed in November 2014, was a large-scale redevelopment of the station forecourt to create a bus and rail interchange.

Hochschule Esslingen
The city is home to the Esslingen University of Applied Sciences. It is known for its mechanical engineering and automotive engineering courses, and also for its three international master's programs (MBA in International Industrial Management, MEng in Automotive Systems, MEng in Design and Development in Automotive and Mechanical Engineering), which are organised by the Esslingen Graduate School and taught completely in English.

Twin towns – sister cities

Esslingen am Neckar is twinned with:

 Coimbatore, India
 Eger, Hungary
 Maladzyechna, Belarus
 Neath Port Talbot, Wales, United Kingdom
 Norrköping, Sweden
 Piotrków Trybunalski, Poland
 Schiedam, Netherlands
 Sheboygan, United States
 Udine, Italy
 Velenje, Slovenia
 Vienne, France

Notable people

Richard Baum (1902–2000), musicologist and music historian
Thommie Bayer (born 1953), writer, musician and painter
Otto Borst (1924–2001), German historian
Karl Deffner (1817–1877), manufacturer, member of parliament
Cristian Fiél (born 1980), Spanish-German football player
Isabelle Faust (born 1972), Violinist
Albert Günther (1830–1914), British zoologist, born in Esslingen
Volker Hauff (born 1940), German politician, former Member of Bundestag, former Lord Mayor of Frankfurt am Main (SPD)
Wolfgang Fritz Haug (born 1936), philosopher
Otto Hauser (born 1952), German politician (CDU), former Member of Bundestag and retired parliamentarian secretary of state
Walter Hirrlinger (born 1926), German politician (SPD), Member of Landtag, minister of economy, 1990–2008 president of Sozialverband VdK Deutschland, 1953 to 1968 member of local council in Esslingen
 Wilhelm Christian Hochstetter (1825–1881), botanist, university gardener and inspector of the botanical garden in Tübingen
Ferdinand von Hochstetter (1829–1884), geographer, geologist and natural scientist
Johann Eberhard Ihle (1727–1814), painter 
Emil von Kessler (1813–1867), founder of the Maschinenfabrik Esslingen (locomotive factory)
Emil von Keßler jun. (1841–1895), German entrepreneur and politician, director of Maschinenfabrik Esslingen, son of Emil von Keßler
Georg Christian von Kessler (1787–1842), founder of the still existing sparkling wine cellar Kessler Sekt
Hermann Kurz (1813–1873), poet, author and translator, father of Isolde Kurz
Alfred Leikam (1915–1992), notary, politician and mayor, Righteous among the Nations
Karl Mayer (1819–1889), politician, member of parliament and parliamentary deputy
Otto Merz (1889–1933), race car driver
Julius Motteler (1838–1907), leading member of the early German workers' movement, Reichstag deputy
Wilhelm Murr (1888–1945), German politician (NSDAP), Gauleiter
Georg Restle (born 1965), journalist
Paula Rueß (1902–1980), German resistance fighter (French Resistance) and feminist
Thomas Ruf (1911–1996), German politician (CDU), Member of Bundestag district Esslingen
 Max Sailer (1882–1964), car racing driver and engineer
Heinrich Schickhardt (1558–1635), builder
Louis Schlegel (1858–1929), German politician (SPD), Member of Reichstag and Landtag
Ronja Schmitt (born 1989), German politician (CDU), Member of Bundestag
Jakob Ferdinand Schreiber (1809–1868), founder of J.F.Schreiber, a publisher known for its children books

References

External links

 
City Portal 
Esslingen University of Applied Sciences 

Towns in Baden-Württemberg
Free imperial cities
Esslingen (district)
1802 disestablishments in the Holy Roman Empire
Populated places on the Neckar basin
Populated riverside places in Germany
Württemberg